The Abu Sayda bombing was a chlorine car bombing attack that occurred on 15 May 2007, in an open-air market in the Iraqi Diyala Governorate village of Abu Sayda. The attack killed up to 45 people and wounded 60 more in the Shia village, the highest death toll of all chlorine bombings in Iraq. Iraqi and American military sources initially denied the use of chlorine.

References

2007 murders in Iraq
21st-century mass murder in Iraq
Bombings in the Iraqi insurgency
Car and truck bombings in Iraq
Chemical weapons attacks
Marketplace attacks in Iraq
Mass murder in 2007
May 2007 events in Iraq
Terrorist incidents in Iraq in 2007
Violence against Shia Muslims in Iraq